Laudonovac is a village in Serbia. It is situated in the Plandište municipality, South Banat District, Vojvodina province. The village has a Serb ethnic majority (66.66%) with a present Romanian (16.66%) and Macedonian (8.33%) minority. Its population numbering 24 people (2002 census).

Historical population

1981: 78
1991: 50
2002: 24
2011: 21

See also
List of places in Serbia
List of cities, towns and villages in Vojvodina

References

Slobodan Ćurčić, Broj stanovnika Vojvodine, Novi Sad, 1996.

Populated places in Serbian Banat
Populated places in South Banat District
Plandište